William K. Hathaway (born 1944) is a contemporary American poet who has published ten collections of poetry with Ithaca House, Louisiana State University Press, University of Central Florida Press, Canios Editions, and Chester Creek Press.  Hathaway's most recent book, Dawn Chorus: New and Selected Poems 1972-2017, was published in March 2018 by Somondoco Press. He is retired and currently resides in Belfast, Maine.

Poetry
Hathaway is perhaps best known for his poem "Oh, Oh," which is included in many college textbooks, including The Bedford Introduction to Literature.  His poems have also appeared in several anthologies, including New American Poets of the '90s and Disenchantments: An Anthology of Modern Fairy Tale Poetry.  In a jacket blurb for Hathaway's 1992 collection Churlsgrace, poet Hayden Carruth remarked, "when I finish reading a poem by Hathaway I feel smarter than I was before, not, as with most poems, stupider. ... Hathaway has a rare intelligence, and when he writes he uses it – which is even rarer. May he be showered with blessings."

In an interview with Adam Tavel at Poets' Quarterly, Hathaway comments that he considers much of his work to be in the lyrical tradition of Keats and Wordsworth, but that his more sardonic poems "take on a sort of “anti” voice, but with not a consciously subversive intention."  Much of Hathaway's early work is written in confessional free verse, as it addresses his struggles with alcoholism that "made a struggle of life," but the central focus of his oeuvre is nature and the rural landscape which remains "ceaselessly poignant."

Career
Hathaway taught for over thirty years at several colleges and universities, including Cornell University, Union College, and Louisiana State University.

Works

Poetry collections

References

External links 
 Winter 2010 Interview at Poets' Quarterly
 Poem "Today" in Poetry, October 2009
 Poem "Betrayal" in Poetry, October 2009
 Poem "Martin Points" in Conte
 Poem "Bufflehead Dawn" in Numero Cinq
 Poem "Bitterness" in Numero Cinq
 Poem "Hummingbird Bully" in Per Contra
 2004 review of Churlsgrace in Eclectica Magazine
 Letter to the Editor of Poetry, October 2005

1944 births
Living people
20th-century American poets
Cornell University faculty
Union College (New York) faculty
Louisiana State University faculty
21st-century American poets